Mavago District is a district of Niassa Province in north-western Mozambique. The principal town is Mavago.  The district lies along the border with Tanzania.  

 Population (est. 2005): 17,046
 Area: 9,112 km2.

Coordinates
 Latitude: 12° 16' 12" South
 Longitude: 36° 33' 31" East

Towns and villages
 Aldeia Calembe
 Aldeia Chitolo
 Aldeia Milepa
 Aldeia Wanga
 Antigo Posto Maziua
 Bilandega
 Cachepa
 Cajomomba
 Mamudo
 Mataca
 Mavago
 Metotela
 M'sawize
 Namacambale
 Nhalopa
 Omar

Further reading
District profile (PDF)

Districts in Niassa Province